Luke A. Keenan (April 10, 1872 – December 1924) was an American politician from New York.

Life
He was born on April 10, 1872, in New York City. He attended the public schools until 1886. Then he studied architecture at the Cooper Union for three years, and afterwards worked as a plasterer. He became active in the trade union movement, and was the plasterers' representative in the building trades section of the Central Labor Union of New York. In 1891, he removed to Astoria, Queens.

Keenan was a member of the New York State Assembly (Queens Co., 1st D.) in 1901 and 1902.

He was a member of the New York State Senate (2nd D.) from 1903 to 1906, sitting in the 126th, 127th, 128th and 129th New York State Legislatures.

He died in December 1924.

Sources

1872 births
1924 deaths
Democratic Party New York (state) state senators
People from Astoria, Queens
Democratic Party members of the New York State Assembly
Cooper Union alumni